Cañita may refer to:

Cañita, Panama
Cyperus giganteus, sometimes called "cañita"
Canita (footballer)